The Saluda Dam or Saluda River Dam, officially the Dreher Shoals Dam, commonly referred to as the Lake Murray Dam, is an earthen embankment dam located approximately 10 miles (15 km) west of Columbia, South Carolina on the Saluda River. Construction on the dam began in 1927 and was completed in 1930. The purpose of the dam is flood control, hydroelectricity, recreation and water supply. At the time of its completion, the Saluda Dam was the world's largest earthen dam, creating the world's largest man-made lake, Lake Murray.

South Carolina Highway 6 crosses over the dam and is used as a fast connection between the towns of Lexington and Irmo.  The yearly football game between rival Lexington High School and Irmo High School is often called "The Battle of the Dam".

Characteristics

The hydroelectricity power station consists of concrete five vertical Francis turbines; three at 32.5 MW, one at 42.3 MW and another at 67.5 MW. The power station receives water by means of five . high intake towers and then into penstocks.

On the dam, South Carolina Highway 6 splits into two lanes, the northward one going in between the main and backup dams, and the southward road staying on the main dam. There is also a walkway across the dam.

History

Saluda Dam Remediation Project

Construction of a backup dam immediately next to the Saluda Dam was completed in 2005 by the SCANA corporation.  The construction was first proposed in 1989 but did not begin until 2002. The roller-compacted concrete backup dam was required by the federal government as a mechanism for preventing flooding if an earthquake of similar magnitude to the 1886 Charleston earthquake was to occur again in South Carolina.  It was projected that large parts of the Columbia, SC metropolitan region (encompassing around 135,000 people) would have been in the flood region if the original dam was damaged.

During construction, workers laid  of roller-compacted concrete in one day, setting a North American record. Because of this and the worker's "...proactive approach to protecting the surrounding communities, and the innovative methods they implemented to achieve that goal...", it received the 2006 American Society of Civil Engineers Outstanding Civil Engineering Achievement Award.

See also

 Lake Murray
 List of lakes in South Carolina

External links
 Scana Insight Article on Dam
 DESCRIPTION OF THE SALUDA HYDROELECTRIC PROJECT
 "Mile Long Earthen Dam Is Impervious To Water", May 1931, Popular Mechanics

References

Dams in South Carolina
Buildings and structures in Lexington County, South Carolina
Hydroelectric power plants in South Carolina
Roller-compacted concrete dams
1930 establishments in South Carolina
Earth-filled dams